Sekirei is an anime series based on the manga of the same title by Sakurako Gokurakuin. Produced by Aniplex and Seven Arcs and directed by Keizō Kusakawa, the story revolves around a college student named Minato Sahashi, whose entire life changes when he meets a Sekirei named Musubi, and later gets involved in a deadly survival game between Sekireis and their masters, or Ashikabis, called the Sekirei Plan.
 
Sekirei was broadcast in Japan on Tokyo MX from July 2 and September 17, 2008. The anime adapts the first fifty chapters of the series. Six uncut DVDs of the first season were released between October 22, 2008 and March 25, 2009. The sixth DVD volume features an original video animation episode titled "The First Errand", which involves Kusano in a shopping race between Musubi and Tsukiumi. A Blu-ray box set of the first season was released on June 30, 2010 with three Blu-ray discs and one additional CD.

A second season, titled Sekirei: Pure Engagement, aired in Japan from July 4 to September 26, 2010 on Tokyo MX with subsequent runs on AT-X, KBS Kyoto, Nagoya Broadcasting Network, Sun TV, TV Hokkaido, and TVQ Kyushu Broadcasting. The limited edition of the Hakuyoku no Seiyaku ~Pure Engagement~/Onnaji Kimochi CD single came bundled with a special three-minute OVA, classified as episode 0, titled "Two Topic Gossip". The full 28-minute version of the OVA was released with the first BD/DVD volume of the second season on August 25, 2010. Both anime seasons are licensed by Funimation for distribution in North America. A DVD box set of first season was released on November 23, 2010.

The opening theme in the first season is "Sekirei" and the ending theme is "Dear sweet heart"; both songs are performed by Saori Hayami (#88 Musubi), Marina Inoue (#9 Tsukiumi), Kana Hanazawa (#108 Kusano), Aya Endo (#2 Matsu). The opening and ending themes were released as part of the Sekirei Original Soundtrack, released on July 23, 2008. The tracks are released in the Hakuyoku no Seiyaku ~Pure Engagement~/Onnaji Kimochi CD and the Sekirei Sound Complete CD.

Individual episodes of the series are called , in reference to birds and the winging process of the Sekireis.

Series overview

Episode list

Sekirei (2008)

Sekirei: Pure Engagement (2010)

References
General
 
 

Specific

External links
 Official Tokyo MX Website 
 Official Website 

Sekirei